Aubonne District was a former district of the canton of Vaud in Switzerland. The seat of the district was the town of Aubonne until January 1, 2008. The municipalities are now part of the district of Morges, except Longirod, Marchissy and Saint-George which are now part of the district of Nyon.

The following municipalities were located in the district:

 Apples
 Aubonne
 Ballens
 Berolle
 Bière
 Bougy-Villars
 Féchy
 Gimel
 Longirod
 Marchissy
 Mollens
 Montherod
 Pizy
 Saubraz
 Saint-George
 Saint-Livres
 Saint-Oyens

References

Former districts of the canton of Vaud